State Road 129 (NM 129) is an approximately  state highway in the U.S. state of New Mexico. Its southern terminus is at Interstate 40 (I-40) and U.S. Route 54 (US 54) in Newkirk, and the northern terminus is in Mesa Rica at NM 104.

Major intersections

See also

References

129
Transportation in Guadalupe County, New Mexico
Transportation in San Miguel County, New Mexico